Best in Show is the seventh studio album from the southern rock band Jackyl.

Father's Day single release with Nigel Dupree Band
The album was released on July 31, 2012, simultaneously with Up to No Good, the second album by Nigel Dupree Band, fronted by the vocalist Nigel Thomas Dupree, the son of Jackyl's lead singer, Jesse James Dupree. In honor of Father's Day, the first singles from Best in Show and Up to No Good, titled "Screwdriver" and "Tumbleweed", respectively, were issued to radio on June 17, 2012, with an add date at radio of June 26, 2012.

Cover songs
The album includes cover versions of "It's Tricky" by Run-D.M.C. and "Cover of the Rolling Stone" by Dr. Hook & the Medicine Show, the latter sampling the "stomp-stomp-clap" of Queen's "We Will Rock You".

Reception
Following its release, Best In Show was met with positive responses. William Clark of Guitar International gave the album a positive review, saying, "Best In Show proves even though the members of Jackyl are 20 years older, nothing has changed when it comes to their crazy party attitude."

In the US, the album debuted at No. 84 on Billboard 200, No. 30 on Top Rock Albums, and No. 7 on Hard Rock Albums, selling around 5,000 in the first week. The album sold 26,000 copies in the United States by July 2016.

Track listing

Personnel
Jesse James Dupree - vocals and chainsaw
Roman Glick - bass guitar
Chris Worley - drums
Jeff Worley - guitars

Charts

References

External links
 
 

2012 albums
Jackyl albums